"Falls Apart" is the first single taken from Thousand Foot Krutch's album The Flame in All of Us. It has received some success on rock radio; reaching No. 33 on the Mainstream Rock charts, as well as No. 4 on ChristianRock.net, a website devoted to Christian music.

The song is one of two off the album to receive a music video, the other being "Favorite Disease".

Awards
In 2008, the song was nominations for a Dove Award for Short Form Music Video of the Year at the 39th GMA Dove Awards.

References

2007 singles
Thousand Foot Krutch songs
2007 songs
Tooth & Nail Records singles
Songs written by Trevor McNevan